This is a list of seasons completed by the Washington Nationals, originally known as the Montreal Expos, professional baseball franchise; they have played in the National League from their inception in 1969. They are an American professional baseball team that has been based in Washington, D.C. since . The Nationals are a member of both the Major League Baseball's (MLB) National League Eastern Division. Since the 2008 season, the Nationals have played in Nationals Park; from 2005 through , the team played in Robert F. Kennedy Memorial Stadium.

The Nationals are the successors to the Montreal Expos, who played in Montreal, Quebec, Canada, from their inception as an expansion team in  through , with the majority of that time (1977–2004) spent in Montreal's Olympic Stadium.

The following takes into account both teams, as all Montreal records were carried with the franchise when it moved to Washington.

Table Key

Season-by-season results

All-time records

Record by decade 
The following table describes the Expos′ (1969–2004) and Nationals′ (2005–2021) combined regular-season won–lost record by decade.

These statistics are from Baseball-Reference.com's Washington Nationals History & Encyclopedia, and are current as of October 5, 2022.

Post-season record by year
The Nationals have made the postseason six times in their history, with their first being in 1981 (as the Expos) and the most recent being in 2019.

Footnotes
The 1972 Major League Baseball strike forced the cancellation of the first seven games (thirteen game-days) of the season.
The 1981 Major League Baseball strike caused the season to split into two halves. This caused Major League Baseball to hold the Divisional Series so that the first- and second-half champions could play each other to determine playoff spots for the NLCS and World Series. As such, the Expos finished one-half game ahead of the second-place St. Louis Cardinals in the second half of the 1981 season. 
The 1994–95 Major League Baseball strike  ended the season on August 11, as well as cancelling the entire postseason.  While Montreal was leading by six games ahead of the second-place Atlanta Braves at the beginning of the strike, no team was officially awarded any division titles.
PCA-PI stands for Players' Choice Award for Outstanding Pitcher in the National League.
RMA stands for the National League Rolaids Relief Man Award.

References

 
Washington Nationals
Washington Nationals
Seasons
Events in Washington, D.C.